Fatu-ma-futi is a village in central Tutuila Island, American Samoa. It is located at the easternmost point of the entrance to Pago Pago Harbor, south of Pago Pago. Flowerpot Rock, also known as Fatu Rock, is found along the highway in Fatumafuti. Legend says Fatu and Futi (two offshore islets) were lovers living in the Manu’a Islands. They wanted to get married but were forbidden to do so. The couple sailed from Savai'i (Samoa), looking for Tutuila Island; their canoe sank, and the pair were transformed into these tree-topped islands.

Demographics

References

Villages in American Samoa
Tutuila